Wentworth is a town in Rockingham County, North Carolina, United States.  The population was 2,646 at the 2020 census. Wentworth is the county seat of Rockingham County and is part of the Greensboro–High Point metropolitan area of the Piedmont Triad. On May 6th, 2022, and EF-1 Tornado hit Wentworth. The storm traveled as a supercell with crazy structure from the Pilot Mountain, North Carolina and Pinnacle, North Carolina area across central Stokes County and into Rockingham County. It took out trees, damaged homes, and blocked roads before it lifted off southwest of Reidsville.

Geography

The town has a total area of 14.4 square miles (37 km), of which, 14.3 square miles (37 km) of it is land and 0.49% or 0.1 square miles (0.26 km) of it is water.

Demographics

2020 census

As of the 2020 United States census, there were 2,662 people, 953 households, and 691 families residing in the town.

2010 census
As of the 2010 U.S. Census, there were 2,807 people and 784 families residing in the town. The population density was 194.3 people per square mile (75.0/km).  The racial makeup of the town was 80.89% Caucasian, 16.91% African American, 0.40% Native American, 0.32% Asian, 0.68% from other races, and 0.79% from two or more races. Hispanic or Latino of any race were 1.33% of the population.

There were 1,018 households, out of which 35.7% had children under the age of 18 living with them, 62.4% were married couples living together, 9.9% had a female householder with no husband present, and 22.9% were non-families. 19.5% of all households consisted of a single individual. The average household size was 2.60 and the average family size was 2.98.

In the town, the population was spread out, with 24.0% under the age of 18, 7.8% from 18 to 24, 32.0% from 25 to 44, 25.0% from 45 to 64, and 11.3% who were 65 years of age or older. The median age was 38 years. For every 100 females, there were 106.2 males.

The median income for a household in the town was $39,083, and the median income for a family was $45,865. Males had a median income of $31,515 versus $23,116 for females. The per capita income for the town was $18,071. About 3.9% of families and 4.5% of the population were below the poverty line, including 1.1% of those under age 18 and 9.9% of those age 65 or over.

History
Wentworth was established as "Rockingham Courthouse" in 1787 making it the oldest settlement in Rockingham County. The post office there was established in November 1794. The settlement was chartered as Wentworth in 1798. Both, Wentworth and Rockingham County were named in homage to the same individual; the Marquis of Rockingham, Charles Watson-Wentworth. Watson-Wentworth served two terms as the Prime Minister of the United Kingdom and greatly advocated for colonial independence.

Almost two hundred years later, in the 1990s, the Wentworth community was facing the possibility of much of its area being annexed into neighboring Reidsville which had repeatedly but unsuccessfully tried to take the county seat for over a century. County officials, none of whom lived in Wentworth, declined to oppose this possible annexation. Nevertheless, the local community banded together with an initiative which stopped this impending annexation.  In 1998, with approval from the state General Assembly, the town of Wentworth amended the lapse within their original 1798 charter and remained as its own municipality. Until its reactivation (which included an area considerably larger than the original courthouse village of approximately one hundred people) Wentworth was the smallest county seat in the state.

The Dead Timber Ford Sluices, Eagle Falls Sluice, Rockingham County Courthouse, Wentworth Methodist Episcopal Church and Cemetery, and Wright Tavern are listed on the National Register of Historic Places.

Government
One of the most widely used forms of government by small cities in North Carolina, Wentworth is governed under the mayor-council form of government.  The Wentworth Town Council has five members, from which one is elected mayor and one is elected mayor pro tem.  Council members are elected in nonpartisan elections and serve four year terms.

Courthouse

Originally, the first session of the  Rockingham County Court met at Eagle Falls on the Dan River in 1786. In 1787 a courthouse was established near the center of the county and the settlement was known as Rockingham Courthouse. However, in 1798, the General Assembly of North Carolina passed an act which established the county seat to be known as Wentworth at the site of the 1787 Courthouse. This courthouse was replaced by a brick courthouse in 1824 and this building was considerably remodeled in a more Victorian style in the 1880s. On October 2, 1906, a terrific fire destroyed the old courthouse and a new one, designed by famed architect Frank Pierce Milburn, was constructed at a cost of $25,000.  The newer courthouse was composed almost entirely of bricks and had two beautiful rounded pillars which quickly became a trademark of the Wentworth community. It was at this courthouse in August 1932 that Broadway torch singer Libby Holman posted bond when she was charged (later acquitted) with the alleged murder of her husband, tobacco heir Z. Smith Reynolds of Winston-Salem. Additions to the courthouse were made in the 1930s, 1960s and 1970s. In 1982 former Vice President Walter Mondale gave a speech at the courthouse prior to his candidacy for president in 1984. A couple of years later the old historic superior courtroom was stripped of its fittings and gutted to make two smaller and inadequate courtrooms.  In May 2011, a new 184,516 square foot Rockingham County courthouse, also known as the "Rockingham County Justice Center," opened its doors at a location one mile east of the historic village area where the courthouses had been since 1787. Construction of this new state-of-the-art building cost $39,059,000, after an originally projected cost of $37,757,000. The three-story Justice Center houses county law enforcement services as well as the county courthouse. 
The 1907 courthouse, on the National Register of Historic Places, now houses the Museum & Archives of Rockingham County (the MARC), Rockingham County's historical museum.

Education
Wentworth Elementary School 
Rockingham County Middle School 
Rockingham County High School 
Rockingham County Early College High School 
Rockingham Community College

References

Towns in Rockingham County, North Carolina
County seats in North Carolina